Kainaat Arora (born 2 December 1986) is an Indian actress who made her debut in the Bollywood 100 crore blockbuster comedy film Grand Masti as Marlow. She also appeared in Mankatha and Khatta Meetha, and sang in Malayalam films.

Early life
Arora was born in a Punjabi family in Saharanpur, Uttar Pradesh. She is the second cousin of late actress Divya Bharti. In 2012 Kainaat adopted an elder lady and has been taking care of her.

Filmography

References

External links

 
 

1982 births
Indian film actresses
Actresses in Hindi cinema
Living people
Actresses in Tamil cinema
Punjabi people
Actresses from Dehradun
Actresses in Malayalam cinema
Actresses in Telugu cinema
Actresses in Punjabi cinema
21st-century Indian actresses